Umbonium, sometimes known as the "button top shells", is a genus of sea snails, marine gastropod molluscs in the family Trochidae, the top snails.

Shell description
The shells of the species in this genus are low-spired and shaped like a button. The orbicular shell is depressed and imperforated. It is polished, porcellaneous and has a very thin pearly layer inside. The whorls are flattened above, bright, smooth or spirally grooved. The small, transverse aperture is wider than high. The thin outer lip is acute. The inner lip is rounded, ending in a simple point. The  umbilicus of the shell is often completely covered with a thick and smooth callus.

Anatomy
The animal has a distinct  lateral fringe of the foot, with three filaments on each side. The front of the right side near the base of the tentacles is produced into a fleshy lobe. The right tentacle is free, with the eye-peduncle compressed, and bears a rudimentary eye. The left eye-peduncle is cylindrical, with a distinct eye, and furnished with an expansion or frontal lobe, which is folded on itself and fringed at its free margin. The operculum is horny, orbicular, and multispiral.

Species
Species in the genus Umbonium include:
 Umbonium callosum  Sowerby, 1887 
 Umbonium conicum (A. Adams & Reeve, 1850)
 Umbonium costatum (Valenciennes in Kiener, 1838 in 1834-50)
 Umbonium elegans (Kiener, 1838)
 Umbonium eloiseae Dance, Moolenbeek & Dekker, 1992
 Umbonium giganteum (Lesson, 1833)
 Umbonium moniliferum (Lamarck, 1822)
 Umbonium sagittatum (Hinds, 1845)
 Umbonium suturale (Lamarck, 1822)
 Umbonium thomasi (Crosse, 1862)
 Umbonium vestiarium (Linnaeus, 1758)
Species brought into synonymy
 Umbonium adamsi Dunker: synonym of  Umbonium thomasi (Crosse, 1862)
 Umbonium bairdii Dall, 1889: synonym of Margarites bairdii (Dall, 1889)
 Umbonium capillata  A. A. Gould, 1861 : synonym of Ethaliella capillata (Gould, 1862)
 Umbonium depressum Adams, 1853: synonym of Umbonium vestiarium (Linnaeus, 1758)
 Umbonium floccata  G. B. Sowerby III, 1903 : synonym of Ethaliella floccata (Sowerby III, 1903) 
 Umbonium guamense Adams, A. 1855: synonym of Ethalia guamensis (Quoy & Gaimard, 1834)
 Umbonium guamensis  J. R. C. Quoy & J. P. Gaimard, 1834 : synonym of Ethalia guamensis (Quoy & Gaimard, 1834)
 Umbonium guamensis selenomphala  H. A. Pilsbry, 1905 : synonym of Ethalia guamensis (Quoy & Gaimard, 1834)
 Umbonium javanicum A. Adams, 1853: synonym of  Umbonium moniliferum (Lamarck, 1822)
 Umbonium nitida  (A. Adams, 1863) : synonym of  Ethalia nitida A. Adams, 1863
 Umbonium omphalotropis  (A. Adams, 1863) : synonym of Ethalia omphalotropis A. Adams, 1863
 Umbonium polita (A. Adams, 1862) : synonym of  Ethalia polita A. Adams, 1862
 Umbonium pulchella (A. Adams in H. & A. Adams, 1854) : synonym of Ethaliella pulchella (A. Adams, 1855)
 Umbonium rufula ( A. A. Gould, 1861) : synonym of Ethalia rufula Gould, 1861
 Umbonium sanguinea  H. A. Pilsbry, 1905 : synonym of  Ethalia sanguinea Pilsbry, 1905
 Umbonium striolatum Adams A., 1855: synonym of Ethalia striolata (A. Adams, 1855)
 Umbonium zelandica (Hombron & Jacquinot, 1855): synonym of Zethalia zelandica (Hombron & Jacquinot, 1855)

References

 Link D.H.F. (1807-1808) Beschreibung der Naturalien-Sammlung der Universität zu Rostock. 1 Abt. [Part 1], pp. 1–50; 2 Abt. [Part 2], pp. 51–100; 3 Abt. [Part 3], pp. 101–165; Abt. 4 [Part 4],pp. 1–30; Abt. 5 [Part 5], pp. 1–38 [1808]; Abt. 6 [Part 6], pp. 1–38 [1808] Rostock, Adlers Erben
 
 
 Williams S.T., Karube S. & Ozawa T. (2008) Molecular systematics of Vetigastropoda: Trochidae, Turbinidae and Trochoidea redefined. Zoologica Scripta 37: 483–506.

External links 

 
Trochidae
Gastropod genera
Taxa named by Johann Heinrich Friedrich Link